Paradise is the debut album by American singer Kaci Battaglia. Released on June 21, 2001 it was only released in the United Kingdom. Selling nearly 10,000 copies in its first week, the album debuted at number 47 on the UK Albums Chart. To date the album has sold nearly 100,000 copies in the UK alone, but only around 20,000 internationally. In 2002, the album was re-released, under the name I'm Not Anybody's Girl. The re-release spawned a new single, titled the same, which had some success on the UK Singles Chart.

Paradise also spawned several successful singles. The album's title track was released as the lead single, and Kaci's debut single in March 2001. It has become a major hit on musical chart in the UK, peaking at number 11 on the official UK Singles Chart. "Tu Amor" was released as the second single, and became Battaglia's second Top 40 hit in the UK. Other singles released include "Intervention Divine" and a cover of The Partridge Family's hit single "I Think I Love You", which became Kaci's first top 10 hit on the UK singles chart.

Background
At age 11, Battaglia independently released A Thousand Stars, an album that was produced by her mother, Donna. A portion of the proceeds from A Thousand Stars went to help a housing project for the less fortunate. Battaglia began looking for a recording contract when she was eleven years old, due to the success of her independent album. She caught the eye of record producer Joel Diamond after Kaci's mom called and asked Diamond to audition her daughter. Diamond put up his own money to record her. After being turned down by over 20 record labels with the demo "Paradise", Mike Curb called Joel Diamond months after receiving the recording and told him that he wanted to sign Kaci to Curb Records.

Her debut single "Paradise" was released in 2001 and hit number 11 in the United Kingdom. The single was followed by  "I Think I Love You". In 2003, she teamed up with a Japanese photographer and released a photo book entitled, Kaci: I'm a Singer. This photo book is filled with pictures of Kaci in her hometown of Clearwater, Florida. The book was released in 2007 exclusively in Japan, along with a re-release of Paradise.

Composition
The majority of the music found on Paradise is pop, however certain songs, such as "I Think I Love You" have more of a club influenced beat, while "Paradise" and "Tu Amor" show influences of Latin music. Many critics have noted the lack of originality in the music, comparing her to many other artists at the time, such as Mandy Moore and Britney Spears, noting similarities with Spears' debut album, ...Baby One More Time. The album's lyrical content mainly deals with love and relationships, from the perspective of a teenage Battaglia. Like most teen pop albums released in the 1990s and early 2000s, the lyrics deal mainly with themes such as love, break-up, desire and joy.

"Paradise" is the first track on the album, and was also released as the album's lead single. It is an uptempo pop song, with a Hispanic tint to it, and the use of a Spanish guitar. It is a cover of the 1982 song by Fausto Papetti. "Kiss Me Crazy" is the second track on the album, and is more modern than the previous track, with more of a club-oriented beat. "Butterflies Don't Lie" is the album's third song. It is a ballad that lyrically speaks of Kaci's feelings for someone. Although she imagines they feel the same way about each other, they actually do not. "Tu Amor" is the fourth track on the album. It features more of a Hispanic feel. "Everlasting" is the fifth song on Paradise, and is an uptempo dance/ballad that speaks of an everlasting love for someone. "I Think I Love You" is the sixth track. It is the album's second and final single. To date, "I Think I Love You" is Kaci's only top 10 hit in the United Kingdom.

"Just an Old Boyfriend" is the seventh song on the album. It is a midtempo pop song about Kaci's break-up with someone, and how she is completely over him. "Beggin' Me" is the eighth, and the most uptempo, song on the album, featuring prominent dance and rock elements. "All Over You" is the next song on the album, and has more of an adult feel to it. It is similar to the album's previous track. "You Got Me" is the tenth song on the album, and has been called the most open song on it. "I'm Gonna Break Your Heart This Time" is the eleventh song on Paradise and is more uptempo than its predecessor. "Intervention Divine" is the final track and was released as the album's second promotional single, after "Tu Amor".

Reception

Critical
The album has received positive reviews, mainly commenting on Battaglia's vocal abilities and the lyrical content of the album. Some critics, however, have stated that Battaglia's debut effort was simply a cliche start, and compared her to the majority of pop artists with hits out at the moment. Despite some negative reviews, overall reception of Paradise was positive, with some critics even stating that Battaglia enlightened them on the feelings and emotions of teenagers with the album's lyrical content.

Commercial
Due to the album only being released in the UK, it failed to have much impact anywhere else. Paradise debuted on the official UK Album's Chart at number 47, selling nearly 10,000 copies in its first week of release. Despite hanging on to the chart for a while, it failed to have the success held by the album's singles. To date, the album has sold nearly 100,000 copies in the UK alone.

Promotion
Paradise was promoted mainly through the use of live performances, as well as the release of two promotional songs. The first of these songs, entitled "Tu Amor", was released in late September 2001, and peaked at number 24 on the official UK Singles Chart. The second song, "Intervention Divine", was released at the beginning of January, just a few days before the album's second official single. The song had little success in the UK or on international charts.

After the release of "I Think I Love You", in 2002, Kaci began touring as the opening act for pop/R&B boy band O-Town (band), in support of their debut album of the same name. The tour lasted for a few months, but Kaci only opened for them for a few shows during their stops in the UK and a few locations in the US. During a stop on the tour in Tampa, Florida, Kaci made an appearance on the popular radio show "WFLZ 93.3's The Big One" on August 25, 2001, where she gave an in-studio performance. During "ESPN's Super Bowl Halftime Show" in January 2002, the music video for her single "Paradise" was played for the audience on the big screen, which provided major promotion. To further promote her album, Pepsi sponsored a tour for Kaci, where she delivered free concert performances in major shopping malls throughout the United States. Kaci's concert tour spanned 10 states during the summer of 2002. On January 1, 2003 Battaglia performed her single "I'm Not Anybody's Girl" at the "Capital One Bowl Halftime Show", to critical acclaim.

Track listing
Paradise Track listing
 Paradise
 Kiss Me Crazy
 Butterflies Don't Lie
 Tu Amor
 Everlasting
 I Think I Love You
 Just An Old Boyfriend
 Beggin' Me
 All Over You
 You Got Me
 I'm Gonna Break Your Heart This Time
 Intervention Divine
I'm Not Anybody's Girl Track listing
 Paradise
 Kiss Me Crazy
 Butterflies Don't Lie
 Tu Amor
 Everlasting
 I Think I Love You
 Just an Old Boyfriend
 Beggin' Me
 All Over You
 You Got Me
 I'm Not Anybody's Girl
 I'm Gonna Break Your Heart This Time
 Intervention Divine
 Un Paraiso [Spanish Version]

Re-release and I'm Not Anybody's Girl
Due to the lackluster performance of the album, Battaglia and her record company decided to re-release the album the following year, and include bonus tracks. The finished product, titled I'm Not Anybody's Girl was released on July 16, 2002. The re-release featured all of the songs from Paradise, and the track listing remained barely edited, except the title track for the re-release is featured as the eleventh track on the album, with "I'm Gonna Break Your Heart This Time" and "Intervention Divine" being moved to the twelfth and thirteenth tracks respectively. A Spanish version of "Paradise" was added to the album as well, appearing as the fourteenth and final track on the album. The original version is still featured on the album.

Despite attempts to promote the album, it failed to chart on the official UK charts, and barely managed to bring any extra sales to Paradise. However, the album's lead single, "I'm Not Anybody's Girl" did have some success on the UK Singles Chart, peaking at number 55. This would be her last single to chart in that country, before Kaci broke out in the US.

The re-release of the album served as Kaci's debut album in countries other than the UK. After the single of the same name had some success on the US Pop stations, the album was expected to be a hit for Battaglia. However, the album failed to chart on the US Billboard 200. The album had similar outcomes worldwide, failing to chart on any charts.

Singles
"Paradise" released as the album's lead single on May 17, 2001. The single's music video features Battaglia on the beach, while singing about her love interest who is also there. There are scenes in the video featuring Kaci dancing with back-up dancers under the pier. The single became a major hit for Battaglia, peaking at number 11 on the UK Singles Chart, and spending 29 un-consecutive weeks on the chart. "Tu Amor" was released as the first promotional single on September 23, 2001, accompanied with a music video. Despite only being a promotional single, it became her second Top 40 hit in the UK, peaking at number 24. "Intervention Divine" was another promotional single, released on January 2, 2002. Unlike the previous promotional release, it did not receive a music video. Due to its release being so close to the album's second official single, "I Think I Love You", "Intervention Divine" failed to make an impact on any of the charts in the UK. "I Think I Love You" was released as the official second and final single from the album, and has become her biggest hit to date in the UK, peaking at number 10 on the official UK singles chart. A video was also released, and features Battaglia singing while holding a picture of her love interest on her bed.

References

2001 debut albums
Contemporary R&B albums by American artists
Kaci Battaglia albums